Arte de la lengua mexicana is the title or part of the title of several grammars of Nahuatl:
Arte de la lengua mexicana y castellana (1571 book) by Alonso de Molina
Arte de la lengua mexicana con la declaración de los adverbios della (1645 book) by Horacio Carochi
Arte de la lengua mexicana (1673 book) by Augustín de Vetancurt
Arte de la lengua mexicana (1689 book) by Antonio Vázquez Gaztelu
Arte de la lengua mexicana según la acostumbran hablar los Indios en todo el obsipado de Guadalajara, parte del de Guadiana y del de Mechoacan (1692 book) by Juan Guerra
Arte de la lengua mexicana (1717 book) by Francisco de Avila
Arte de la lengua mexicana (1754 book) by Joseph Augustin de Aldama y Guevara
Arte de la lengua mexicana (1810 book) by Rafael Tiburcio Sandoval

See also
Arte para aprender la lengua mexicana (1547 book) by Andrés de Olmos
Arte mexicana (1595 book) by Antonio del Rincón
Arte mexicano (1642 book) by Diego de Galdo Guzmán
Arte de el idioma mexicano (1713 book) by Manuel Pérez
Arte novíssima de lengua mexicana (1753 book) by Carlos de Tapia Centeno
Arte, vocabulario, y confesionario en el idioma mexicano, como se usa en el obispado de Guadalaxara (1765 book) by Geronymo Thomas de Aquino Cortés y Zedeño